Marlin High School is a public high school in the city of Marlin, Texas, United States. It is part of the Marlin Independent School District located in central Falls County. The school is classified as a 3A school by the University Interscholastic League (UIL). In 2015, the school was rated "Met Standard" by the Texas Education Agency.

Athletics
The Marlin Bulldogs compete in cross country, volleyball, football, basketball, golf, track, softball, and baseball

Football

2011
The Bulldogs started 1-5-1, 1-2 but were able to win their last three against Hearne, Academy, and McGregor. The Marlin Bulldogs made the playoffs for the second straight year, but were eliminated by Harmony, 9–7.

State titles
Marlin (UIL)

Boys' track - 
1914(1A), 1991(3A)

Marlin Washington (PVIL)
Girls' track - 
1957(PVIL-2A), 1957(PVIL-2A), 1962(PVIL-3A), 1963(PVIL-3A)

State finalists
Marlin (UIL)

Football - 
1964(2A), 2003(3A/D2) 
Lost to Palacios 12–0 in 1964 and Atlanta 34–0 in 2003.

Marlin Washington (PVIL)
Football - 
1964(PVIL-3A)

Notable alumni
Danario Alexander
Dan Kubiak

References

External links
Marlin ISD

High schools in Central Texas
Schools in Falls County, Texas
Marlin, Texas
Public high schools in Texas